Kompot or compote is a non-alcoholic sweet beverage that may be served hot or cold, depending on tradition and season. It is obtained by cooking fruit such as strawberries, apricots, peaches, apples, raspberries, rhubarb, plums, or sour cherries in a large volume of water, often together with sugar or raisins as additional sweeteners. Sometimes different spices such as vanilla or cinnamon are added for additional flavour, especially in winter when kompot is usually served hot. Kompot is popular in Central and Eastern European countries as well as in Southern Europe.

Kompot 
Kompot is part of the culinary cultures of many countries in Central, Eastern, Southern Europe and Middle East, such as Bulgaria, Armenia, Albania, Azerbaijan, Belarus, Kazakhstan, Ukraine, Russia, Poland, Bosnia and Herzegovina, Lithuania, Latvia, Estonia, Hungary, Slovakia, Slovenia, Croatia, North Macedonia, Serbia, Montenegro, Moldova and Romania (where it is known as compot), Kosovo, the Czech Republic, Greece, Georgia, Cyprus and Turkey. Kompot (компот in: Bulgarian, Russian; Polish, Serbian, Bosnian, Macedonian and Ukrainian; Komposto in Turkish) was a widely used way of preserving fruit for the winter season in Southern and Eastern European countries. In 1885, Lucyna Ćwierczakiewiczowa wrote in a recipe book that kompot preserved fruit so well it seemed fresh. Kompot was still popular in the 1970s. It is also popular in many Central Asian countries, such as Uzbekistan and Kyrgyzstan.

The consumption of kompot has been declining since the 1980s. With the end of food preservation in many countries of South and Eastern Europe, kompot has been supplanted by fruit juice, soft drinks and mineral water.

Uzvar 
Uzvar or vzvar is a similar drink, prepared from various dried fruit and sometimes berries, sweetened with honey or sugar.

See also 

Compote
Fruit cocktail
Fruit punch
Kissel
Mors
Tong sui

References

External links 
Apple-cranberry kompot recipe
Dried fruit kompot (Uzvar) recipe
Cherry kompot recipe at About.com

Desserts
Fruit dishes
Polish drinks
Slavic cuisine
Bulgarian cuisine
Hungarian cuisine
Romanian cuisine
Moldovan cuisine
Soviet cuisine
Kazakh drinks
Turkish cuisine
Armenian cuisine